First Rodeo is honeyhoney's debut album, released on November 4, 2008, under the now-defunct Ironworks record label, run by actor Kiefer Sutherland and friend Jude Cole.  Sutherland directed and starred in the group's music video for their song "Little Toy Gun".

Track listing

References

Honeyhoney albums
2008 debut albums